The England men's national field hockey team competes in most major international tournaments except the Olympic Games. England's only appearance at the Olympics was at London 1908 when they won gold; since then English players have competed at the Olympics as part of the combined Great Britain national field hockey team.

England's best finish in the Hockey World Cup was as runners-up to champions Australia in 1986, which was also held in London. They won the bronze medal at the inaugural Commonwealth Games hockey tournament in 1998 in Kuala Lumpur, as well as in 2014 in Glasgow and in Birmingham in 2022.

Competitive record

Summer Olympics

World Cup

European Championships

Commonwealth Games

FIH Pro League

Defunct competitions

Champions Trophy

Champions Challenge I

World League

*Draws include matches decided on a penalty shoot-out.

Players

Current squad
The squad for the 2023 Men's FIH Hockey World Cup.

Head coach: Paul Revington

Recent call-ups
The following players have also been called up for the national team in the last 12 months.

Results and fixtures

2021-22 Men's FIH Pro League

Commonwealth Games 2022

See also
England women's national field hockey team
Great Britain men's national field hockey team
Great Britain women's national field hockey team

References

External links

FIH profile

National team
European men's national field hockey teams
Field hockey
Sport in Berkshire
Royal Borough of Windsor and Maidenhead